Jack Nusan Porter is an American writer, sociologist, human rights and social activist, and former treasurer and vice-president of the International Association of Genocide Scholars. He is a former assistant professor of social science at Boston University and a former research associate at Harvard's Ukrainian Research Institute. He is a research associate at the Davis Center for Russian and Eurasian Studies at Harvard University, doing research on Israeli-Russian relations, especially the life of Golda Meir, as well as doing work on mathematical and statistical models to predict genocide and terrorism and modes of resistance to genocide.  His most recent books are Is Sociology Dead?, Social Theory and Social Praxis in a Post-Modern Age, The Genocidal Mind, The Jew as Outsider, and Confronting History and Holocaust.

Early life and education

Nusia Jakub Puchtik was born December 2, 1944, in Rovno, Ukraine to Jewish-Ukrainian partisan parents Faljga Merin and Srulik Puchtik. The family emigrated to the United States on June 20, 1946 and their name was Anglicized to Porter.

Growing up in Milwaukee, Wisconsin, Porter attended Washington High School and was active in Habonim Dror, a Labor Zionist Youth movement. He left for Israel soon after high school and worked on Kibbutz Gesher Haziv and studied in Jerusalem at the Machon L'Madrichei Chutz La'Aretz (a youth leaders institute). Porter eventually returned to Wisconsin and attended the University of Wisconsin–Milwaukee from 1963-1967, majoring in sociology and Hebrew Studies. Going for the Ph.D. in sociology, he was accepted in 1967 to Northwestern University, studying under Howard S. Becker, Bernie Beck, Janet Abu-Lughod, and Charles Moskos. In the late 1960s, Porter was an active leader in the moderate wing of Students for a Democratic Society. However, in response to the growing anti-Zionism emanating from the black and white leftist movements, Porter and other students at Northwestern founded in 1970 the activist Jewish Student Movement, a forerunner to all Jewish “renewal” groups and predecessor to Michael Lerner’s Tikkun movement.

Career 
In 1976, Porter founded the Journal of the History of Sociology; it published its first issue in 1978. In the 1980s,  Porter founded The Spencer Institute For Business and Society; a new age think tank. Also incorporated into the Spencer Institute For Business and Society was the Ahimsa Project. He also set up the Spencer School of Real Estate in 1983 and became a real estate developer, building housing in Roxbury, Massachusetts.

In 2001, Porter was ordained a rabbi by an Orthodox Vaad in New York City, attending the trans-denominational Academy for Jewish Religion in Manhattan in the late 1990s; after which he served congregations in Marlboro and Chelsea, Massachusetts and most notably in Key West, Florida, where he led a controversial Jewish outreach program to native Key Westers known as “Conchs”, northeastern U.S. “Snowbirds”, Miami’s Jewish, Cuban, and intermarried “Jewban” populations, transvestites, gay and lesbian parishioners.

In the spring of 2012 Porter ran for United States House of Representatives for the 4th Congressional seat in Massachusetts as a write-in candidate following the departure of incumbent Representative Barney Frank. Running as a Democrat, Porter described himself as a "radical-libertarian-progressive" and aligned his views with those of Representative Ron Paul and Vermont Senator Bernie Sanders. Porter's write-in candidacy gained less than 0.1% of the vote; Joseph Kennedy III won the primary with approximately 90% of the vote and was later elected to his first term in Congress in the 2012 general election.

Selected works
Porter's books include:
 Student Protest and the Technocratic Society: The Case of ROTC (Chicago: Adams Press, 1973 and based on his sociology Ph.D. dissertation from Northwestern University, June 1971)
 Jewish Radicalism with Peter Dreier (Grove Press, 1973)
The Sociology of American Jews (University Press of America, 1978, 1980)
The Jew as Outsider (University Press of America, 1981; The Spencer Press, 2014)
Jewish Partisans: A documentary of Jewish resistance in the Soviet Union during World War II (University Press of America, 1982; The Spencer Press, 2013)
Conflict and Conflict Resolution: An Historical Bibliography (Garland Publishing, 1982)
Genocide and Human Rights: A Global Anthology (University Press of America, 1982)
Confronting history and Holocaust (University Press of America, 1983; new edition with bibliography of Porter's works, The Spencer Press, 2014)
Sexual politics in the Third Reich: The Persecution of the Homosexuals During the Holocaust (The Spencer Press, 1991, with Rudiger Lautmann and Erhard Vismar; 20th Anniversary edition, The Spencer Press, 2011)
The Sociology of Genocide: A Curriculum Guide (American Sociological Association, 1992)
The Sociology of Jewry: A Curriculum Guide (American Sociological Association, 1992)
Women in Chains: On the Agunah (Jason Aronson, 1995)
The Genocidal Mind: Sociological and Sexual Perspctives (University Press of America, 2006)
Is Sociology Dead? Social Theory and Social Praxis in a Post-Modern Age (University Press of America, 2008)

Awards
2004: Lifetime Achievement  Award, American Sociological Association Section on the History of Sociology for his founding of the Journal of the History of Sociology, 1977-1982. He shared the award with Glenn Jacobs and Alan Sica.

2009   The Robin Williams Award for Distinguished Contributions to Scholarship, Teaching, and Service from the American Sociological Association, Section on Peace, War, and Social Conflict (for his work in genocide and Holocaust studies).

References

1944 births
Living people
People from Milwaukee
Ukrainian Jews
American Zionists
Northwestern University alumni
University of Wisconsin–Milwaukee alumni
Boston University
Harvard University staff
American sociologists
Massachusetts Democrats
American human rights activists
Jewish human rights activists
Jewish activists
American anti–Vietnam War activists
Ukrainian emigrants to the United States